Parleza may refer to the following places in Poland:

Parleza Mała
Parleza Wielka